Ulla Tillander (1931-1994) was a Swedish politician (Centre Party (Sweden)). 

She was MP of the Parliament of Sweden in 1974–1994. 

She served as Deputy Minister of Education in 1981–1982.

References

1931 births
1994 deaths
20th-century Swedish politicians
20th-century Swedish women politicians
Women members of the Riksdag
Women government ministers of Sweden